Songs for the Sinners is the fifth and last full-length album by the Finnish gothic metal act Charon.

Track listing 
 "Colder" – 4:50
 "Deep Water" – 4:15
 "Bullet" – 4:11
 "Rain" – 3:57
 "Air" – 3:31
 "She Hates" – 4:21
 "Ride on Tears" – 3:38
 "Gray" – 3:49
 "Rust" – 4:44
 "House of the Silent" – 6:39

Personnel

Band members 
 Juha-Pekka Leppäluoto – vocals
 Pasi Sipilä – guitars, programming, keyboards
 Lauri Tuohimaa – guitars
 Teemu Hautamäki – bass
 Antti Karihtala – drums

Guest musicians 
 Jenny Heinonen – female vocals
 Santeri Kallio – keyboards
 Tomi Koivusaari – sitar
 Marko Manninen – cello
 Kari Tornack – Hammond solo on "Bullet"

Charon (band) albums
2005 albums
Spinefarm Records albums